Lester Frank Sumrall (February 15, 1913 – April 28, 1996) was an American Pentecostal pastor and evangelist. He founded the Lester Sumrall Evangelistic Association (LeSEA) and its humanitarian arm LeSEA Global Feed the Hungry, World Harvest Radio International, and World Harvest Bible College.

Life and career
Sumrall was born to Betty and George Sumrall in New Orleans on February 15, 1913. He began preaching at the age of 17 after a recovery from tuberculosis. At the age of 19, he founded a church in Green Forest, Arkansas, and was ordained by the Assemblies of God.

In 1934, Sumrall began traveling abroad. He preached in Tahiti and New Zealand and established a church in Brisbane, Australia. He traveled with Howard Carter throughout eastern Asia and Europe. In South America, Sumrall met Louise Layman. The couple were married on September 30, 1944, and had three children: Frank Lester (born 1946), Phillip Stephen (1950) and Peter Andrew (1953-2015).

Sumrall and his family spent many years in the Philippines during the 1950s. He flew to Manila, Philippines upon learning about the possession of Clarita Villanueva, whom he claims to have delivered from two demonic entities in 1953 . The culmination of his evangelistic work in the country was the establishment of the Cathedral of Praise in Manila. With over 24,000 members, it is the largest congregation in the Philippines.

In 1957, Sumrall established the Lester Sumrall Evangelistic Association. He would also found World Harvest Bible College (now Indiana Christian University) and World Harvest Magazine. In 1963, Sumrall moved to South Bend, Indiana, to pastor Christian Center Cathedral of Praise (now Christian Center Church). It was around this time that he withdrew from the Assemblies of God denomination.
 
In 1968, Sumrall began what would become World Harvest Missionary Evangelism (WHME-FM)l. Sumrall has been called the "father of Christian television". From 1972 to 1997, he acquired television stations throughout the United States as part of World Harvest Television (also known as LeSEA Broadcasting). In 1987, Sumrall established a humanitarian aid organization, LeSEA Global Feed the Hungry.

Sumrall wrote many works during his lifetime ranging from topics such as evangelism, miraculous healing, demons and exorcism, angels and more. Some of his works were of a more polemic nature such as warning about the supposed dangers and detrimental effects of movies and Roman Catholicism. He also wrote some    autobiographical works: "Adventuring with Christ", The Life Story of Lester Sumrall: The Man, the Ministry, the Vision (as told to Tim Dudley), Through Blood and Fire in Latin America, and My Three Sons.

Sumrall died on April 28, 1996, at age 83.

Works (selected)
Adventuring with Christ; illustrated, 128 pp.
Worshipers of the Silver Screen; with a foreword by Edith Mae Pennington, 64 pp.
Roman Catholicism Slays, 61 pp. Zondervan, 1940
Demons, The Answer Book, 1979, 139 pp. Thomas Nelson Publishers
Dominion is Yours!, 1981
The Will, The Potent Force of the Universe, 1985, 66 pp. LeSEA Publishing Co.
The Gifts and Ministries of the Holy Spirit, 1985

Bibliography

Murphy, Leona Sumrall (1984) Miracles and the Sumrall Family. Praise Books

References

External links
 

1913 births
1996 deaths
20th-century apocalypticists
American Assemblies of God pastors
American evangelicals
American evangelists
American television evangelists
Critics of the Catholic Church
Family Broadcasting Corporation
20th-century American clergy